Skare Church is a parish church of the Church of Norway in Ullensvang Municipality in Vestland county, Norway. It is located in the village of Skare. It is the church for the Skare parish which is part of the Hardanger og Voss prosti (deanery) in the Diocese of Bjørgvin. The brown, wooden church was built in a long church design in 1926 using plans drawn up by the architect Olaf Nordhagen. The church seats about 230 people.

History
Planning for a new church in Skare began during the 1910s. The new building was designed by Olaf Nordhagen and the lead builder was Eirik Kvammen. The plans for the National Romantic style church were approved in 1917. The church was consecrated on 5 October 1926 by Bishop Peter Hognestad.

See also
List of churches in Bjørgvin

References

Ullensvang
Churches in Vestland
Long churches in Norway
Wooden churches in Norway
20th-century Church of Norway church buildings
Churches completed in 1926
1926 establishments in Norway